Rifat (also transliterated as Rifaat, a conjugated form of the Arabic verb رفع with the meaning "lifted", "elated", "joyous") is a masculine name. Variants also include Refat, Rafat, Refaat, etc. Notable people with the name include:

 Rifaat al-Assad, Syrian military personnel and politician
 Rifat Chadirji, Iraqi architect and author
 Rıfat Ilgaz (1911–1993), Turkish poet
 Rifat Mustafin, Russian footballer
 Rifat Ozbek, Turkish fashion designer
 Rifaat Turk (born 1957), Israeli footballer
 Rifat Zhemaletdinov (born 1996), Russian footballer of Tatar origin

See also
 Kamal Rifaat, Egyptian military officer and politician
 Rasheek Rifaat, Canadian engineer

Turkish masculine given names
Arabic masculine given names